Pozzoleone is a town in the province of Vicenza, Veneto, north-eastern Italy. It is west of SP16 provincial road.

Twin towns
Pozzoleone is twinned with:

  Ennistymon, Ireland
  Schimatari, Greece

References

External links
(Google Maps)

Cities and towns in Veneto